Sokolniki  (German Sokollnik) is a settlement in the administrative district of Gmina Dąbrowa, within Opole County, Opole Voivodeship, in south-western Poland.

References

Sokolniki